Crocodile River 
 Crocodile River (Limpopo), river in the north of South Africa, tributary of the Limpopo River
 Crocodile River (Mpumalanga), river in the northeast of South Africa, tributary of the Komati River
 Crocodile River (Minnesota), river in Minnesota